Events from the year 1720 in Russia

Incumbents
 Monarch – Peter I

Events

 Gold Sword for Bravery
  Annenkrone

Births

Deaths

References

 
Years of the 18th century in Russia